Janusz Komorowski (9 October 1905 – 24 November 1993) was a Polish equestrian. He competed in two events at the 1936 Summer Olympics.

References

1905 births
1993 deaths
Polish male equestrians
Olympic equestrians of Poland
Equestrians at the 1936 Summer Olympics
Sportspeople from Warsaw